Brandon Oldenburg is an American filmmaker and illustrator.

Career
He was an early employee of Reel FX Creative Studios (1995), doing a combination of design and special effects for television and film. Serving as Senior Creative director for 15 years, he worked with such clients as Troublemaker Studios, Pixar, Disney, DreamWorks and Blue Sky Studios. From 1998 to 2009, Oldenburg oversaw a joint venture with William Joyce and Reel FX. Oldenburg and Joyce's other collaborations include Halloween decor for Martha Stewart, Parade Floats for Disney and Title Design for feature films. Their most recent story was 2012's Rise of the Guardians.

Later works
In 2009, Oldenburg and Joyce founded Moonbot Studios in Shreveport, Louisiana. Their initial goal was to create an Academy Award-nominated animated short film as a calling card of the quality of the studio's work. In 2012, they overshot their goal when The Fantastic Flying Books of Mr. Morris Lessmore won not only the nomination but the Oscar.

In 2017, Oldenburg and the creative leadership from Moonbot merged with the VR team from Reel FX to form a new company called Flight School.

Recognition
Oldenburg's work has won many industry accolades, most recently the Distinguished Alumni of the Year from Ringling College of Art and Design, where he received his BFA in Illustration and sits on the Board of Trustees. Oldenburg and renowned designer Brad Oldham collaborated on a giant sculptural series for a $1.4 million commission called The Traveling Man, which has drawn national attention. Brandon's illustrations have graced the covers for such prestigious authors' books as Elmore Leonard and Michael Chabon.

External links

References

American filmmakers
American illustrators
Directors of Best Animated Short Academy Award winners
Living people
Ringling College of Art and Design alumni
Year of birth missing (living people)